The Constantine Gondola lift is a gondola lift, situated in Constantine in Algeria. It carries commuters through the gorges of the Rhumel River to link the eastern part of the city at the place Tatache Belkacem (formerly rue Thiers) to the west in the city Emir Abdelkader, to the University Hospital Ben Badis. Opened in June 2008, it has 33 detachable cabins with 15 seats each, connecting the two terminals in 8 minutes and can carry up to 2,000 people per hour.

The Stations

Station Tannoudji (AEK City, driving station) 
 - Altitude: 707 meters
 - Total area: 2480 m2
 - The resort area: 1680 m2
 - Surface parking areas: 800 m2

Station CHU (middle station) 
 - Altitude: 675 meters
 - Total area: 1820 m2

Tatache Station Place (reference station) 

 - Altitude: 619.29 m
 - Total area: 1700 m2
 - The resort area: 1400 m2
 - Surface parking areas: 300 m2

lines Length  
 Length of the line Tatache Place - CHU: 425 meters.
 Length of the line CHU - AEK City: 1092 meters.

See also 

Constantine tramway
There are Gondola lifts comparables in the cities of Tlemcen (Algeria) and Skikda (Algeria).

References

External links
Doppelmayr official web site.

Gondola lifts in Algeria
Aerial
Public inquiries in Algeria
Buildings and structures in Constantine, Algeria
2008 establishments in Algeria